Con el diablo en el cuerpo is a 1947 Argentine film directed by Carlos Hugo Christensen and starring Susana Freyre, Juan Carlos Thorry and Tito Gómez.

It is a remake of the 1937 Italian film I've Lost My Husband!.

Cast
Susana Freyre
Juan Carlos Thorry
Tito Gómez
Miguel Gómez Bao
Diego Martínez
Amelita Vargas
Horacio Peterson
Gloria Ferrandiz
Ángel Walk
Agustín Orrequia

References

External links
 

1947 films
1940s Spanish-language films
Argentine black-and-white films
Films directed by Carlos Hugo Christensen
1940s Argentine films